Parey may refer to the following communes in France:
 Parey-Saint-Césaire, in the Meurthe-et-Moselle department
 Parey-sous-Montfort, in the Vosges department